The House of Unrest is a 1931 British mystery film directed by Leslie Howard Gordon and starring Dorothy Boyd, Malcolm Keen and Tom Helmore. It was made as a quota quickie at Cricklewood Studios.

Cast
 Dorothy Boyd as Diana  
 Malcolm Keen as Hearne  
 Tom Helmore as David  
 Leslie Perrins as Cleaver  
 Hubert Carter as Ben  
 Mary Mayfren as Agnes

References

Bibliography
 Chibnall, Steve. Quota Quickies: The Birth of the British 'B' Film. British Film Institute, 2007.
 Low, Rachael. Filmmaking in 1930s Britain. George Allen & Unwin, 1985.
 Wood, Linda. British Films, 1927-1939. British Film Institute, 1986.

External links

1931 films
British mystery films
1931 mystery films
Films shot at Cricklewood Studios
Quota quickies
British black-and-white films
1930s English-language films
1930s British films